George Keverian (June 3, 1931 – March 6, 2009) was an American Democratic Party politician who served as the Speaker of the Massachusetts House of Representatives from 1985 until 1991. In his role in the legislature, he was an advocate for greater openness in leadership, free speech and government reform.

Early life and education
George Keverian was born in Everett, Massachusetts, located in Middlesex County, near Boston.  Keverian was the son of Armenian parents who immigrated to America from Turkey before 1915; his mother was a dressmaker and his father ran a shoe repair business.

Keverian attended Everett High School where he was a champion runner the valedictorian of the class of 1949. Keverian attended Tufts College for two years before transferring to Harvard College. Keverian graduated from Harvard in 1953.

Early political career
He was elected to the City of Everett Common Council in 1954 at the age of 21, shortly after his graduation from Harvard. Running for three seats in a field of three dozen, Keverian used a high-speed motion picture camera suggested by his brother that could capture still images of each house in the ward.   He sent an individualized flier to each house with a photo of their own home and a message about the attention he would offer the neighborhood.  He served on the Common Council until 1961, serving as President of the Common Council from 1960 to 1961.

Massachusetts House of Representatives
In 1966, Keverian was elected to represent the 20th Middlesex District in the Massachusetts House of Representatives.

From 1975 to 1978 Keverian was the House Majority Whip, the number three leadership position in the Massachusetts House of Representatives.
In 1978 Keverian was chosen to be the House Majority Leader, the number two leadership position in the Massachusetts House of Representatives.

Speaker of the Massachusetts House of Representatives

Serving in the Massachusetts House of Representatives, he won the position as Speaker of the House from fellow Democrat Thomas W. McGee in January 1985,  bringing reformers in the legislature to back his candidacy. Though he was able to bring greater openness, he had difficulties as a leader and in pushing through legislation. He left the post, and state politics, in 1991, after losing the Democratic party primary for Massachusetts State Treasurer.

Later life
He returned to Everett, where he was appointed as the city's chief assessor in 1995. He lost the position in 2007, with Keverian claiming that he had lost the post due to conflicts with the city's mayor; the mayor stated that the position had been eliminated.

Weighing as much as 400 pounds by 2002, Keverian blamed his place in the public eye for his weight problems, telling a 2003 forum on obesity at the Harvard School of Public Health that "People can be very, very cruel, even when they're not trying to be" and that "Having all that publicity and public acceptance worked against me". He was able to bring his weight down to 260 pounds following gastric bypass surgery in 2002.

The George Keverian School in Everett, Massachusetts is named after him. Keverian had been scheduled to read a Dr. Seuss book to first-graders at the school on the day of his death.

Death and burial
Keverian died at age 77, on March 6, 2009.  He was buried in Glenwood Cemetery in Everett, Massachusetts.

See also
 1967–1968 Massachusetts legislature
 1969–1970 Massachusetts legislature
 1971–1972 Massachusetts legislature
 1973–1974 Massachusetts legislature
 1975–1976 Massachusetts legislature
 1977–1978 Massachusetts legislature
 1979–1980 Massachusetts legislature
 1981–1982 Massachusetts legislature
 1983–1984 Massachusetts legislature
 1985–1986 Massachusetts legislature
 1987–1988 Massachusetts legislature
 1989–1990 Massachusetts legislature

References

Bibliography
Heslam, Jessica.: The Boston Herald, Longtime pol George Keverian found dead Former House speaker, fondly remembered by colleagues, friends, was 77, (March 7, 2009).
O'Neill, Edward B.: Public officers of the Commonwealth of Massachusetts, page 83, (1985).
O'Neill, Edward B.: Public officers of the Commonwealth of Massachusetts, page 164, (1983).

Harvard Law School alumni
American people of Armenian descent
Politicians from Everett, Massachusetts
Speakers of the Massachusetts House of Representatives
Democratic Party members of the Massachusetts House of Representatives
Tufts University alumni
1931 births
2009 deaths
20th-century American politicians
Harvard College alumni
Ethnic Armenian politicians